Karina Mora (born November 17, 1980) is a Mexican actress. She has appeared in various telenovelas and more than fifteen films since 1999.

Filmography

References

External links 
 Official website

1980 births
Living people
Mexican telenovela actresses
Mexican film actresses
Actresses from Yucatán (state)
People from Mérida, Yucatán
20th-century Mexican actresses
21st-century Mexican actresses